The Winterthur–Etzwilen railway line is a railway line in Switzerland. It links Winterthur in the canton of Zurich with Etzwilen in the canton of Thurgau.

The line was opened on 17 July 1875 between Winterthur and Etzwilen by the Swiss National Railway (SNB) company. By 1878 the railway company was in bankruptcy, and the line was taken over by the Swiss Northeastern Railway (NOB). Since 1902 the line has been part of the network of the Swiss Federal Railways (SBB). The line was electrified between Oberwinterthur and Etzwilen in 1946, the section from Winterthur Hbf to Oberwinterthur having been electrified since 1928.

The line is served throughout by hourly passenger trains of Zurich S-Bahn line S29, which links Winterthur and Stein am Rhein. Additionally, alternate trains of line S12 provide an hourly service to Seuzach from Zurich.

References

External links 

Railway lines in Switzerland
Swiss Federal Railways lines
15 kV AC railway electrification